is a Japanese foil fencer.

He won the individual silver medal at World Championships in 2017.

References

External links 

This article has links in Wikidata

 

1997 births
Asian Games bronze medalists for Japan
Fencers at the 2018 Asian Games
Living people
Japanese male foil fencers
Asian Games medalists in fencing
Medalists at the 2018 Asian Games
Universiade medalists in fencing
Universiade gold medalists for Japan
Medalists at the 2017 Summer Universiade
Fencers at the 2020 Summer Olympics
Olympic fencers of Japan
20th-century Japanese people
21st-century Japanese people